Leonardo Vinci (1690 – 27 May 1730) was an Italian composer known chiefly for his 40 or so operas; comparatively little of his work in other genres survives. A central proponent of the Neapolitan School of opera, his influence on subsequent opera composers such as Johann Adolph Hasse and Giovanni Battista Pergolesi was considerable.

Life and career

He was born at Strongoli and educated at Naples under Gaetano Greco in the Conservatorio dei Poveri di Gesù Cristo. He first became known for his opere buffe (comic operas) in Neapolitan dialect in 1719; he also composed many opere serie (dramatic operas). He was received into the Congregation of the Rosary, a lay religious and burial fraternity, at Formiello in 1728. He died in May 1730.  Vinci is rumoured to have been poisoned by a jealous husband in the wake of an ill-advised affair, a story which is given by several reliable authorities without evident contradictions.

Music
Vinci's opere buffe, of which Li zite 'ngalera (1722) is generally regarded as the best, are full of life and spirit; his opere serie, of which Didone Abbandonata (Rome, 1726) and Artaserse (Rome, 1730) are the most notable, have an incisive vigour and directness of dramatic expression praised by music historian Charles Burney. According to Burney, 

The well-known aria "Vo solcando," from Artaserse, is a good example of his style.

Works

Operas

Le doje lettere (1719)
Lo cecato fauzo (1719)
Lo scagno (1720)
Lo scassone (1720)
Lo Barone di Trocchia (1721)
Don Ciccio (1721)
Li zite 'ngalera (1722)
La festa di Bacco (1722)
Publio Cornelio Scipione (1722)
Lo castiello sacchiato (1722)
Lo labberinto (1723)
Semiramide (1723)
Silla dittatore (1723)
L'Eraclea (1724)
Farnace (1724)
La mogliera fedele (1724)
Turno Aricino (1724)
Ifigenia in Tauride (1725)
La Rosmira fedele (1725) also known as Partenope (1725)
Il trionfo di Camilla (1725)
Elpidia (1725)
L'Astianatte (1725)
Didone abbandonata (1726)
Siroe, Re di Persia (1726)
L'asteria (1726)
Ernelinda (1726)
Gismondo, Rè di Polonia (1727)
La caduta dei Decemviri (1727)
 Il Medo (1728)
Catone in Utica (1728)
Flavio Anicio Olibrio (1728)
Alessandro nell'Indie (1729)
Farnace (1729)
La Contesa dei Numi (1729)
Massimiano (1729)
Artaserse (1730)

Other works
In addition to operas, Vinci wrote a few cantatas, sonatas, a serenata, and two oratorios (Oratorio di Maria dolorata ca. 1723 and Oratorio per la Santissima Vergine del Rosario ca. 1730). His sonata in D major for flute and basso continuo is still played today. He composed two sonatas for the recorder in addition to a recorder concerto in A minor.

Selected recordings
 Fileno – Soprano Cantatas Mesta Oh Dio, tra queste selve. Mi costa tante lacrime. Amor di Citerea. Parto, ma con qual core. Emanuela Galli & Francesca Cassinari, Stile Galante, Stefano Aresi. With work wrongly attributed to Vinci by Alessandro Scarlatti Fille, tu parti? Oh Dio! Pan Classics 2011.
 In 2015 Decca released a Parnassus Arts Productions recording of his 3-act opera seria, Catone in Utica (Rome, 1728).

Notes

References

Sources

External links

 
 
 Arte TV broadcast of the 2022 Bayreuth production of Alessandro nel Indie

1690 births
1730 deaths
18th-century Italian male musicians
Neapolitan school composers
18th-century Italian composers
Italian Baroque composers
Italian male classical composers
Italian opera composers
Male opera composers
People from the Province of Crotone